Julio Peralta and Horacio Zeballos won the title, beating Nicolás Barrientos and Eduardo Struvay 6–3, 6–4

Seeds

Draw

Draw

References
 Main Draw

Open Bogota - Doubles